Jan Thomas Lauritzen (born February 6, 1974, in Sarpsborg) is a former Norwegian handball player. He played 254 matches and scored 557 goals for the Norway men's national handball team between 1993 and 2008. He participated at the 1997, 1999, 2001, 2005 and 2007 World Men's Handball Championship and has participated multiple time in the EHF Cup, the Challenge Cup, and the EHF Champions League.

References

External links

1974 births
Living people
Norwegian male handball players